NGC 212 is a lenticular galaxy located approximately 369 million light-years from the Solar System in the constellation Phoenix. It was discovered on October 28, 1834 by John Herschel.

See also 
 Lenticular galaxy 
 List of NGC objects (1–1000)
 Phoenix (constellation)

References

External links 
 
 SEDS

0212
2417
Lenticular galaxies
Phoenix (constellation)